Daniel Mark L. Cox (born 28 September 1990 in Lincoln, England), is a British tennis player.

While playing tennis for Lincolnshire, he first came into international prominence when he reached the finals of Le Petit As, Tarbes. A right-hander who favours slow hardcourts, but seems to be comfortable on all surfaces, Cox recently chose Marco Tennis Academy, in Marbella, as a training base, favouring the warm weather training in Spain over that in the United Kingdom.

Career

2006
Daniel spent the first few months of the year attempting to qualify for various Futures and Satellite tournaments. Although he came across little success initially, he finally qualified for a Futures event in Portugal before losing in the first round to an ATP top 500 player.

He took very little time to adjust himself to the 18-and-under circuits when he finally made his debut in April. He reached the semi-finals of a Grade 5 tournament in Sutton and followed it by a finals appearance in a Grade 5 tournament in Nottingham the very next week.

2007

Cox advanced to the second round of the Australian Open Boys' Singles championship before losing to Roman Jebavý of the Czech Republic.  In the Boys' Doubles competition, Daniel reached the quarter-finals with Gastão Elias of Portugal.

2011
2011 was the best year of Cox's career to date, reaching a career high singles ranking of 258 and receiving a wildcard into both the men's singles and doubles at Wimbledon. In the singles, he lost 2–6, 4–6, 4–6 to Sergiy Stakhovsky in round one. In the doubles, he partnered James Ward, losing again in round one to Mikhail Kukushkin and Michael Russell, 6–4, 4–6, 4–6.

2014
In 2014, Cox reached the world's top 250 for the first time. He entered the Australian Open qualifiers for the first time in his career. He was defeated in the first round by American Denis Kudla.

After a few good wins in Challenger tours, Cox again entered the qualifying stage at a Grand Slam for the first time; this time it was Roland Garros. Cox defied the odds in the first round defeating Israel's Number 2 Amir Weintraub 6–2, 6–1. This was his first every victory in a Grand Slam qualification round outside of Wimbledon. In the second round he faced top qualifying seed – and world number 89 – Paolo Lorenzi and lost 3–6, 6–7.

Cox was rewarded with reaching a career high by receiving a wildcard to the main draw of Wimbledon. He lost in 4 sets to former top-25 player Jérémy Chardy 2–6, 6–7, 7–6, 3–6. After his defeat, Cox went to play on some more Challenger tours reaching the semi-finals in Binghamton before losing to Sergiy Stakhovsky. At Binghamton, Cox won his first ever title at Challenger level, teaming-up with fellow Brit Daniel Smethurst to win the Doubles, defeating Stakhovsky and Marius Copil in the final 6–7, 6–2, 10–6.

Challenger and Futures/World Tennis Tour finals

Singles: 29 (16–13)

Doubles: 10 (1–9)

References

External links
 
 

1990 births
Living people
English male tennis players
Sportspeople from Lincoln, England
British male tennis players
Tennis people from Lincolnshire